The River Ericht is a short river which flows generally southwards from the southern end of Loch Ericht for 3 miles / 5 km to enter Loch Rannoch near its western end at Bridge of Ericht.

References 

Ericht
2ErichtRannoch